The bolon or M'Bolon is a traditional harp played in Mali, as well as Guinea. It was notably played in hunting ceremonies or before a battle, to rouse warriors' valor. It was also used by the Jola in Gambia for accompaniment for men's choruses. Among other string instruments played in Guinea, the bolon is the oldest.

The bolon is a three-stringed instrument, constructed from a large calabash covered by unshaven goat skin, and a bow-shaped neck. When playing, it is placed between the legs with the strings facing the musician. In addition to plucking the strings, the musician also hits the calabash as if playing a drum.

References

Malian musical instruments
Harps
Harp lutes